Khaled Abdulqoddus (born 9 June 1980) is a Kuwaiti former footballer who played as an attacking midfielder for Kuwaiti Premier League side Al Shabab on loan from Al-Arabi.

He played for Al-Arabi in the 2007 AFC Champions League group stage.

References

1980 births
Living people
Kuwaiti footballers
Kuwait international footballers
Asian Games medalists in football
Footballers at the 1998 Asian Games
Footballers at the 2002 Asian Games
Asian Games silver medalists for Kuwait
Association football midfielders
Medalists at the 1998 Asian Games
Al-Arabi SC (Kuwait) players
Kuwait Premier League players
Al-Shabab SC (Kuwait) players
Al-Yarmouk SC (Kuwait) players